Churchbridge may refer to:

 Churchbridge, Cornwall, England
 Churchbridge, Saskatchewan, Canada
 Rural Municipality of Churchbridge No. 211, Saskatchewan, Canada
 Churchbridge, Staffordshire, England